Roman historiography stretches back to at least the 3rd century BC and was indebted to earlier Greek historiography. The Romans relied on previous models in the Greek tradition such as the works of Herodotus (c. 484 – 425 BC) and Thucydides (c. 460 – c. 395 BC). Roman historiographical forms are usually different from their Greek counterparts, however, and often emphasize Roman concerns.  The Roman style of history was based on the way that the Annals of the Pontifex Maximus, or the Annales Maximi, were recorded. The Annales Maximi include a wide array of information, including religious documents, names of consuls, deaths of priests, and various disasters throughout history.  Also part of the Annales Maximi are the White Tablets, or the "Tabulae Albatae", which consist of information on the origin of the Roman Republic.

During the Second Punic War with Carthage, Rome's earliest known annalists Quintus Fabius Pictor and Lucius Cincius Alimentus recorded history in Greek, and relied on Greek historians such as Timaeus. Roman histories were not written in Classical Latin until the 2nd century BC with the Origines by Cato the Elder. Contemporary Greek historians such as Polybius wrote about the rise of Rome during its conquest of Greece and ascension as the primary power of the Mediterranean in the 2nd century BC. Moving away from the annalist tradition, Roman historians of the 1st century BC such as Sallust, Livy, and even Julius Caesar wrote their works in a much fuller narrative form. While Caesar's De Bello Gallico focused specifically on his wars in Gaul, Roman works that served as a broad universal history often placed heavy emphasis on the origin myth of the founding of Rome as a starting point. These works formed the basis of the Roman historiographic models utilized by later Imperial authors of the Principate era, such as Tacitus and Suetonius.

History

Foundation

Before the second Punic war, there was no historiography in Rome, but the clash of civilisations it involved proved a potent stimulus to historiography, which was taken up by the two senators (and participants in the war), Quintus Fabius Pictor and Lucius Cincius Alimentus, who may be considered the "Founders" of Roman Historiography. Pictor wrote a history of Rome in Greek, not Latin. This choice of writing about the war in Greek arose from a need to address the Greeks and counter another author, Timaeus, who also wrote a history of Rome until the Second Punic War.  Timaeus wrote with a negative view of Rome.  Therefore, in defense of the Roman state, Pictor wrote in Greek, using Olympiad dating and a Hellenistic style. Pictor's style of writing history defending the Roman state and its actions, and using propaganda heavily, eventually became a defining characteristic of Roman historiography, while he is also known for the establishment of the ab urbe condita tradition of historiography which is writing history "from the founding of the city".

Cincius also wrote in Greek, but seems to have been less esteemed by later historians: thus for the Battle of Lake Trasimene, Livy states that he "has accepted Fabius as my main source, since he was contemporary with this war", whereas earlier, on the question of Hannibal's numbers, he says that "the most authoritative account should be that of Lucius Cincius Alimentus...but Cincius makes a mess of the numbers".

After Pictor wrote, many other authors followed his lead, inspired by the new literary form: Gaius Acilius, Aulus Postumius Albinus, and Cato the Elder. Cato the Elder is credited as the first historian to write in Latin. His work, the Origines, was written to teach Romans what it means to be Roman. Like Pictor, Cato the Elder wrote ab urbe condita, and the early history is filled with legends illustrating Roman virtues. The Origines also spoke of how not only Rome, but the other Italian towns were venerable, and that the Romans were indeed superior to the Greeks.

The Romans enjoyed serious endeavors and so the writing of historiography became very popular for upper class citizens who wanted to spend their time on worthwhile, virtuous, "Roman" activities. As idleness was looked down upon by the Romans, writing history became an acceptable way to spend their otium or retirement.

Almost as soon as historiography started being used by the Romans, it split into two traditions: the annalistic tradition and the monographic tradition.

The annalistic tradition

The authors who used the Annalistic tradition wrote histories year-by-year, from the beginning, which was most frequently from the founding of the city, usually up until the time that they were living in.

Some annalistic authors:
Gnaeus Gellius (c. 140 BC) wrote his history from Aeneas until 146 BC.
Lucius Calpurnius Piso Frugi (c. 133 BC) wrote to demonstrate the reasons for the decline of Roman society. His history chronicled Rome from its foundation until 154 BC, which he regarded as the lowest point of Roman society. Cicero described Piso's work as "annals, very jejunely written".  
Publius Mucius Scaevola (c. 133 BC) wrote a history from the foundation of the city in 80 books.
Sempronius Asellio (c. 100 BC) wrote a history from the Punic Wars until c. 100 BC, as a patriotic encouragement.  
Quintus Claudius Quadrigarius wrote mainly about warfare, mainly taking the patriotic line that all Roman wars are just, and that the Senate and all Roman dealings were honorable.

The monographic tradition

Monographs are more similar to present-day history books. They are usually on a single topic, but most importantly, they do not tell history from the beginning, and they are not even necessarily annalistic. An important sub category that emerged from the monographic tradition was the biography.

Some monographic authors:
Gaius Gracchus wrote a biography of his brother, Tiberius Gracchus.
Gaius Fannius also wrote a biography of Tiberius Gracchus, but showed him in a negative light.
Lucius Coelius Antipater wrote a monograph on the Second Punic War, notable for its improved style and efforts at fact-checking.  
Sallust wrote two monographs: Bellum Catilinae (also known as De Catilinae Coniuratione), which is about the Catilinarian conspiracy from 66 to 63 BC, and the Bellum Jugurthinum, which is about the war with Jugurtha which took place from 111 to 105 BC. John Burrow called him "a master of economical, lucid and dramatic narrative, and of acid, if exaggerated comment", and noted his subsequent influence both on Roman and on Renaissance thought.

Factionalized history

Often, especially in times of political unrest or social turmoil, historians re-wrote history to suit their particular views of the age. So, there were many different historians each rewriting history a little bit to bolster their case. This was especially evident in the 70s BC when the social wars were going on between the populists led by Marius, and the senatorials led by Sulla. Several authors wrote histories during this time, each taking a side. Gaius Licinius Macer was anti-Sullan and wrote his history, based on Gnaeus Gellius in 16 books, from the founding of the city until the 3rd century BC, whereas Valerius Antias who was pro-Sulla, wrote a history in 75 books, from the founding of the city until 91 BC: both were used subsequently by Livy to create a more evenly balanced account.

Overview

The historiography we most readily identify with the Romans, coming from sources such as Caesar, Sallust, Livy, Tacitus, and other minor authors, owes much to its early roots and Greek predecessors.  However, contrary to the Greek form, the Roman form included various attitudes and concerns that were considered strictly Roman. As the recording of Roman history began to evolve and take shape, many characteristics came to define what we know today as Roman historiography, most notably the strong defense of and allegiance to the Roman state and its wide variety of moral ideals, the factional nature of some histories, the splitting of historiography into two distinct categories, the Annals and the Monograph, and the rewriting of history to suit the author's needs.

Characteristics

Annals are a year-by-year arrangement of historical writing.  In Roman historiography, annals generally begin at the founding of Rome.  Proper annals include whatever events were of importance for each year, as well as other information such as the names of that year's consuls, which was the basis by which Romans generally identified years.  The annals seem originally to have been used by the priesthood to keep track of omens and portents.

The Annales Maximi were a running set of annals kept by the Pontifex Maximus.  The Annales Maximi contained such information as names of the magistrates of each year, public events, and omens such as eclipses and monstrous births.  The Annales Maximi covers the period from the early Roman Republic to around the time of the Gracchi, though the authenticity of much of the material (as eventually published) cannot be guaranteed.  A monograph is a comprehensive work on a single subject.  The monograph could be written about a single event, a technique, rhetoric, or one of any number of other subjects.  For example, Pliny the Elder once published a monograph on the use of the throwing-spear by cavalry. Monographs were among the most common historical works found in Roman writings.

Ab urbe condita, literally "From the founding of the city", describes the Roman tradition of beginning histories at the founding of the city of Rome.  In Livy's Ab Urbe Condita, much time is spent on the early history of Rome, and on the founding of the city itself.  In Sallust's histories, the founding and early history of Rome is almost reduced to a single sentence.  Thus, the ab urbe condita form is extremely variable while continuing to mould Roman histories.

"Senatorial History" describes history written by or with information from a Roman Senator.  Senatorial histories are generally particularly informative due to their "insider's" perspective.  A general pattern of Senatorial histories is that they seem to invariably contain a reason that the author is writing histories instead of remaining involved in politics. Sullan annalists politicized their past. They were partisans of the Sullan faction who carried on the Marius and Sulla conflict through their histories, often rewriting them to fit their own agenda. Some Sullan annalists may have been sources for Livy. Valerius Antias (fl. 80-60 BC) was a Sullan annalist but he was not viewed as a credible historian. He seems to have been trying to counter the Marian historian, C. Licinius Macer, whose veracity is also questionable.   Antias' history, written in seventy-six books, is melodramatic and often filled with exaggerations and lies: Livy wrote of “Valerius, who is guilty of gross exaggerations of numbers of all kinds”. In his history, anyone named Cornelius is considered a hero and anyone named Claudius is an enemy, and the opposition to the populares never went by a consistent name but were instead called "boni", "optime" or "optimates", implying that they were the good guys.

Roman historiography is also very well known for subversive writing styles. The information in the ancient Roman histories is often communicated by suggestion, innuendo, implication and insinuation because their attitudes would not always be well received, as with Tacitus’ attitude to Tiberius.  Tacitus was critical of the emperors and believed that they were one of the reasons for the decline of Rome, and even wrote disparagingly of Augustus the most revered of the emperors.

In Roman historiography commentarii is simply a raw account of events often not intended for publication. It was not considered traditional "history" because it lacked the necessary speeches and literary flourishes.   Commentarii was usually turned into "history" later on. Many think Caesar's account of the Gallic Wars, Commentarii Rerum Gestarum (Commentaries on Things Done), was called commentarii for propagandistic purposes. They believe that it is actually "history" since it is so well written, pro-Roman and fits the traditional patterns of historiography.

Ancient Roman historians did not write for the sake of writing, they wrote in an effort to convince their audiences. Propaganda is ever present and is the function of Roman historiography. Ancient Roman historians traditionally had personal and political baggage and were not disinterested observers. Their accounts were written with the specific moral and political agendas. For example, Q. Fabius Pictor started the tradition of historiography that was concerned with both morality and history and affirmed the prestige of Roman state and its people.

Ancient Roman historians wrote pragmatic histories in order to benefit future statesmen. The philosophy of pragmatic history treats historical happenings with special reference to causes, conditions and results. In Roman Historiography the facts and an impression of what the facts mean are presented. Interpretation is always a part of historiography; Romans never made any pretense about it. Conflict between the facts and the interpretation of those facts indicate a good historian. Polybius, who wrote in Greek, was the first pragmatic historian. His histories have an aristocratic ethos and reveal his opinions on honor, wealth and war. Tacitus was also a pragmatic. His histories have literary merit and interpretations of facts and events. He was not purely objective, rather his judgments served a moral function.

Major extant historians

Caesar

Julius Caesar was born 12 July 100 BC into a patrician family. As a young man, he was given a priesthood as Flamen Dialis by his father-in-law, Cornelius Cinna. When that position was taken away by Sulla, Caesar spent a decade in Asia, earning a great reputation in the military. Upon his return to Rome, he was both elected tribunus militium and given the priesthood as a pontifex. During his time in these positions, Caesar befriended Pompey and Crassus, the two men with whom he would later form the First Triumvirate. As the years went on, recognition for Caesar's political, military, and oratory skills grew and he easily was elected praetor and consul. After his consulship, Caesar gained control of the provinces of Illyricum,  Cisalpine, and Transalpine Gaul. In 58 BC, trouble arose in the Gallic provinces, sparking one of the most important wars of Caesar's career.

The De Bello Gallico is Caesar's account of the Gallic Wars. As the Wars were raging on, Caesar fell victim to a great deal of criticisms from Rome. De Bello Gallico is a response to these criticisms, and a way for Caesar to justify these wars. His argument is that the Gallic Wars were both just and pious, and that he and his army attacked Gaul in self-defense. The Helvetians were forming a massive migration straight through the provinces. When a group of neighboring allies came to Caesar himself asking for help against these invading Helvetians, that was all the justification Caesar needed to gather his army. By creating an account that portrays himself as a superb military hero, Caesar was able to clear all doubts in Rome about his abilities as a leader.

Although Caesar used this account for his own gain, it is not to say that the De Bello Gallico is at all unreliable. The victories that Caesar has written about did, in fact, occur. Smaller details, however, may have been altered, and the word choice makes the reader more sympathetic to Caesar's cause. De Bello Gallico is an excellent example of the ways in which retellings of actual events can be spun to a person's advantage. For this reason, De Bello Gallico is often looked at as a commentary, rather than a piece of actual historiography.

His companion piece, Commentarii de Bello Civili, faced a more difficult challenge in presenting the author's actions in a positive light, but by framing his soldiers as uniformly heroic, and himself as acting in defence of his official status and Roman liberty too, Caesar again makes a good case for himself.

Livy

Titus Livius, commonly known as Livy, was a Roman historian, best known for his work entitled Ab Urbe Condita, which is a history of Rome "from the founding of the city". He was born in Patavium, which is modern day Padua, in 59 BC and he died there in 17 AD.   Others referred to his writing as having "patavinitas". Little is known about his life, but based on an epitaph found in Padua, he had a wife and two sons. We also know that he was on good terms with Augustus and he also encouraged Claudius to write history.

Ab Urbe Condita covered Roman history from its founding, commonly accepted as 753 BC, to 9 BC. It consisted of 142 books, though only books 1–10 and 21–45 survive in whole, although summaries of the other books and a few other fragments exist. The books were referred to as "decades" because Livy organized his material into groups of ten books.   The decades were further split in pentads:
Books 1–5 cover from the founding to 390 BC.
Books 6–10 cover 390–293 BC.
Though we do not have books 11–20, evidence suggests that books 11–15 discussed Pyrrhus and books 16–20 dealt with the First Punic War.
Books 21–30 cover the Second Punic War:
21–25 deal with Hannibal.
26–30 deal with Scipio Africanus.
The wars against Philip V in Greece are discussed in books 31–35.
The wars against Antiochus III in the east in books 36–40.
The Third Macedonian War is dealt with in books 40–45.
Books 45–121 are missing.
Books 121–142 deal with the events from 42 through 9 BC.

The purpose of writing Ab Urbe Condita was twofold. The first was to memorialize history and the second was to challenge his generation to rise to that same level. He was preoccupied with morality, using history as a moral essay. He connects a nation's success with its high level of morality, and conversely a nation's failure with its moral decline.  Livy believed that there had been a moral decline in Rome, and he lacked the confidence that Augustus could reverse it. Though he shared Augustus' ideals, he was not a "spokesman for the regime". He believed that Augustus was necessary, but only as a short term measure.

According to Quintillian, Livy wrote lactea ubertas, or "with milky richness". He used language to embellish his material, including the use of both poetical and archaic words. He included many anachronisms in his work, such as tribunes having power that they did not have until much later. Livy also used rhetorical elaborations, such as attributing speeches to characters whose speeches could not possibly be known. Though he was not thought of as a first-rate research historian, being overly dependent on his sources,  his work was so extensive that other histories were abandoned for Livy. It is unfortunate that these other histories were abandoned, especially since much of Livy's work is now gone, leaving holes in our knowledge of Roman history.

Sallust

C. Sallustius Crispus, more commonly known as Sallust, was a Roman historian of the 1st century BC, born c. 86 BC in the Sabine community of Amiternum. There is some evidence that Sallust's family belonged to a local aristocracy, but we do know that he did not belong to Rome's ruling class. Thus he embarked on a political career as a "novus homo", serving as a military tribune in the 60s BC, quaestor from 55 to 54 BC, and tribune of the plebs in 52 BC. Sallust was expelled from the senate in 50 BC on moral grounds, but quickly revived his career by attaching himself to Julius Caesar. He served as quaestor again in 48 BC, as praetor in 46 BC, and governed the new province in the former Numidian territory until 44 BC., making his fortune in the process.   Sallust's political career ended upon his return to Rome and Caesar's assassination in 44 BC.

We possess in full two of the historical works that have been convincingly ascribed to Sallust, the monographs, Bellum Catilinae and Bellum Jugurthinum. We have only fragments of the third work, his Histories. There is less agreement about the authorship of some other works that have, at times, been attributed to him. In Bellum Catilinae, Sallust outlines the conspiracy of Catiline, a brash and ambitious patrician who tried to seize power in Rome in 63 BC. In his other monograph, Sallust used the Jugurthine War as a backdrop for his examination of the development of party struggles in Rome in the 1st century BC. The Historiae describe in general the history of the years 78–67 BC.

Although Sallust's purposes in writing have been debated over the years, a major theme of his is that of moral decline, similar to the attitude of a censor. The historical details outlined in his monographs serve as paradigms for Sallust. In Bellum Catilinae, Sallust uses the figure of Catiline as a symbol of the corrupt Roman nobility, though he also presents a wider picture of the Roman political scene beyond Catiline himself.  The content of Bellum Jugurthinum also suggests that Sallust was more interested in character studies (e.g. Marius) than the details of the war itself. With respect to writing style, the main influence on Sallust's work was Thucydides, perhaps also Cato the Elder. Evidence of the former's influence includes emphasis on politics, use of archaisms, character analysis, and selective omission of details. The use of such devices as asyndeton, anaphora, and chiasmus reflect preference for the old-fashioned Latin style of Cato to the Ciceronian periodic structure of his own era.

Whether Sallust is considered a reliable source or not, he is largely responsible for our current image of Rome in the late republic. He doubtlessly incorporates elements of exaggeration in his works and has at times been described as more of an artist or politician than historian. But our understanding of the moral and ethical realities of Rome in the 1st century BC would be much weaker if Sallust's works did not survive.

Tacitus

Tacitus was born c. 56 AD in, most likely, either Cisalpine or Narbonese Gaul.  Upon arriving in Rome, which would have happened by 75, he quickly began to lay down the tracks for his political career.  By 88, he was made praetor under Domitian, and he was also a member of the quindecimviri sacris faciundis.  From 89 to 93, Tacitus was away from Rome with his newly married wife, the daughter of the general Agricola.  97 saw Tacitus being named the consul suffectus under Nerva.   It is likely that Tacitus held a proconsulship in Asia.  His death is datable to c. 118.

There is much scholarly debate concerning the order of publication of Tacitus' works; traditional dates are given here. 
98 – Agricola (De vita Iulii Agricolae).  This was a laudation of the author's father-in-law, the aforementioned general Cn. Iulius Agricola.  More than a biography, however, can be garnered from the Agricola: Tacitus includes sharp words and poignant phrases aimed at the emperor Domitian.
98 – Germania (De origine et situ Germanorum).  "belongs to a literary genre, describing the country, peoples and customs of a race" (Cooley 2007).
c. 101/102– Dialogus (Dialogus de oratoribus).  This is a commentary on the state of oratory as Tacitus sees it.
c. 109 – Histories.  This work spanned the end of the reign of Nero to the death of Domitian.  Unfortunately, the only extant books of this 12–14 volume work are 1–4 and a quarter of book 5.
Unknown – Annales (Ab excessu divi Augusti).  This is Tacitus' largest and final work.  Some scholars also regard this as his most impressive work.  The date of publication and whether it was completed at all are unknown.  The Annales covered the reigns of Tiberius, Caligula, Claudius, and Nero.  Like the Histories, parts of the Annales are lost: most of book 5, books 7–10, part of book 11, and everything after the middle of 16.  Tacitus' familiar invective is also present in this work.

Tacitus' style is very much like that of Sallust.  Short, sharp phrases cut right to the point, and Tacitus makes no bones about conveying his point.  His claim that he writes history "sine ira et studio" ("without anger and partiality") (Annales I.1) is not exactly true.   Many of his passages ooze with hatred towards the emperors. Despite this seemingly obvious partisan style of writing, much of what is said can go under the radar, which is as Tacitus wanted things to be.  His skill as an orator, which was praised by his good friend Pliny, no doubt contributes to his supreme mastery of the Latin language. Not one to mince words, Tacitus does not waste time with a history of Rome ab urbe condita.  Rather, he gives a brief synopsis of the key points before he begins a lengthier summary of the reign of Augustus.  From there, he launches into his scathing account of history from where Livy would have left off.

Edward Gibbon considered Tacitus the very model of the philosophic historian.

Suetonius

Gaius Suetonius Tranquillus (Suetonius) is most famous for his biographies of the Julio-Claudian and Flavian emperors and other notable historical figures.  He was born around 69 to an equestrian family. Living during the times of the Emperor Trajan and having a connection to Pliny the Younger, Suetonius was able to begin a rise in rank in the imperial administration.  In c. 102, he was appointed to a military tribune position in Britain, which he did not actually accept.  He was, though, among the staff for Pliny's command in Bithynia.  During the late period of Trajan's rule and under Hadrian, he held various positions, until he was discharged.  He had a close proximity to the government as well as access to the imperial archives, which can be seen in his historical biographies.

Suetonius wrote a large number of biographies on important literary figures of the past (De Viris Illustribus).  Included in the collection were notable poets, grammarians, orators, historians, and philosophers.  This collection, like his other works, was not organized chronologically.  Not all of it has survived to the present day, but there are a number of references in other sources to attribute fragments to this collection.

His most famous work, though, is the De Vita Caesarum.  This collection of twelve biographies tells the lives of the Julio-Claudian and Flavian Emperors, spanning from Julius Caesar to Domitian.  Other than an introductory genealogy and a short summary of the subject's youth and death, the biographies do not follow a chronological pattern.  Rather than chronicling events as they happened in time, Suetonius presents them thematically.  This style allowed him to compare the achievements and downfalls of each emperor using various examples of imperial responsibilities, such as building projects and public entertainment.  However, it makes dating aspects of each emperor's life and the events of the early Roman Empire difficult.  It also completely removes the ability to extrapolate a causal sequence from the works.  Suetonius's purpose was not a historical recount of events, though, but rather an evaluation of the emperors themselves.

Suetonius's style is simple; he often quotes directly from sources that were used, and artistic organization and language does not seem to exist, though subtler skills have been detected by some.  He addresses points directly, without flowery or misleading language, and quotes from his sources often.  However, he is often criticized that he was more interested in the interesting stories about the emperors and not about the actual occurrences of their reigns.  The style, with which he writes, primarily stems from his overarching purpose, to catalogue the lives of his subjects.  He was not writing an annalistic history, nor was he even trying to create a narrative.  His goal was the evaluation of the emperors, portraying the events and actions of the person while they were in office.  He focuses on the fulfillment of duties, criticizing those that did not live up to expectations, and praising bad emperors for times when they did fulfill their duties.

There are a variety of other lost or incomplete works by Suetonius, many of which describe areas of culture and society, like the Roman Year or the names of seas.  However, what we know about these is only through references outside the works themselves.

Other notable historians

Polybius (c. 208–116 BC) was a prominent Greek who figured strongly in the Achaean League.  Upon being captured by the Romans and transported to Rome, Polybius took it upon himself to record the history of Rome in order to explain Roman tradition to his fellow Greeks.  He wanted to convince them to accept the domination of Rome as a universal truth.  His main work, Histories, is extant despite its being fragmented.
Diodorus Siculus was a Greek historian of the 1st century BC. His main body of work was the Bibliotheca, which consisted of forty books and was intended to be a universal history from mythological times to the 1st century BC. He employed a very simple and straightforward style of writing, and relied heavily on written accounts for his information, most of which are now lost. Often criticized for a lack of originality and deemed a "scissors and paste" historian, Diodorus endeavored to present a comprehensive human history in a convenient and readable form.
Dionysius of Halicarnassus (fl. c. 8 BC.) was a Greek historian and critic living in Rome. His major work was Roman Antiquities, a history of Rome from its mythical beginnings until the first Punic war, consisting of 20 books. Generally he is considered to be a less reliable source than most of the other historians, but he does fill in the gaps in Livy's accounts. Other works include: On Imitation, On Dinarchus, On Thucidides, and On the Arrangement of Words.
Pliny the Elder, uncle of Pliny the Younger, wrote in the 1st century AD.  He was an officer in the Roman military who died in the eruption of Mount Vesuvius in 79 AD. His known works include Naturalis Historia, which is a collection of books on natural history, Bella Germanica, a 21 book history of the German wars which occurred during his lifetime, and a 31 book history of Julio-Claudian Rome.
Titus Flavius Josephus (born 39 AD) was a Jewish historian and apologist. His works include The Jewish War (75 to 79), Antiquities of the Jews (93), The Life of Flavius Josephus (95) and Against Apion (Publication date unknown). He was influenced by Thucydides and Polybius and was endorsed by the Emperor Titus. Though many critics thought that he was a traitor to his people, his writings show that he was a zealous defender of the Jewish faith and culture. He is notable for being the primary source on the Second Temple Period, the First Jewish-Roman War and for mentioning Jesus of Nazareth, James the Just and many other New Testament figures.
Appianus of Alexandria (c. 95–165) wrote in Greek his Romaiken istorian [Roman History], about half of which survives. This work is best known for its coverage of the Civil Wars of the late Republic (in his Books XIII to XVII). Appian addresses here the period roughly from 133 to 35 BC, i.e., from the reforms of Tiberius Gracchus to the death of Sextus Pompey.
Dio Cassius was a distinguished Greek senator.  After establishing his political career, Dio Cassius began to write various literary works.  His most famous and recognized work is called the Roman History, which consists of 80 books.  This work is dominated by the change from a Roman republic to a monarchy of emperors, which Dio Cassius believed was the only way Rome could have a stable government.  Today, the only surviving portion of the Roman History is the part from 69 BC to 46 AD.
In his 31 book history, sometimes translated as The Roman History or The Roman Empire, Ammianus Marcellinus described the time from the reign of Nerva to the Battle of Adrianople, though the first thirteen books are lost.  Bringing into the remaining books his own personal experiences in military services, his writing had a unique descriptive quality, of the geography, the events, and even the character of the actors.  There is an active debate about whether the intent of the history was a continuation of Tacitus.
The Historia Augusta is a compilation of biographies of the Roman emperors from 117 to 284. Though claimed to be written by several different authors (Aelius Spartianus, Julius Capitolinus, Vulcacius Gallicanus, Aelius Lampridius, Trebellius Pollio and Flavius Vopiscus Syracusanus), contemporary research has shown that it may have been written by only one writer. This one author may have had good reason to disguise his identity, since much of the information in the Historia has also been found to be very unreliable and the work is generally considered a mixture of fact and fiction.
In Late Antiquity, a great quantity of breviaria, or short historical works, were published (see Aurelius Victor, Eutropius, Festus, Epitome de Caesaribus). They may have had a common source, the so-called Enmannsche Kaisergeschichte (Enmann's History of the Emperors, so called because its existence was theorized by German scholar Alexander Enmann), which is lost.
Zosimus was a pagan historian who wrote at c. 500 AD a history of Rome to 410 in six books. Although he couldn't be compared with Ammianus Marcellinus, his work is important for the events after 378.
 The important histories of Priscus and Olympiodorus of Thebes are lost except for some fragments.
Velleius Paterculus was a Roman historian who lived from around 19 BC to after 30 AD. He wrote Historiae Romanae, which is a summary of Roman history from the founding of the city to 30 AD. Though almost all of his work is now missing, it is still a valuable source on the reigns of Augustus and Tiberius. He "represents the adulatory type of history condemned by Tacitus, who ignores Velleius, as do all ancient authorities".

See also

References

Sources
Cooley, Alison E. Introduction. The Annals of Imperial Rome. By Tacitus. Trans. Alfred John Church and William Jackson Brodribb. New York: Barnes & Noble, 2007.
Daugherty, Gregory N. Lecture. Randolph-Macon College. 25 September  2007.
Daugherty, Gregory N. Lecture. Randolph-Macon College. 18 October 2007.
Ewan, Colin. Caesar: De Bello Gallico 1. London: Bristol Classical Press, 2002.
Gould, H.E. and Whiteley, J.L. Livy: Book 1. 9th ed. London: Bristol Classical Press, 2001.
Hadas-Lebel, Mireille. Translated by Richard Miller. Flavius, Josephus: Eyewitness to Rome's First Century Conquest of Judea. New York: Macmillan Publishing Company, 1993.
Hornblower, Simon and Spawforth, Antony. The Oxford Classical Dictionary. (Third Edition) New York: Oxford University Press, 1996.
McGushin, Patrick. Sallust: Bellum Catilinae. 3rd ed. London: Bristol Classical Press, 1995.
Miller, N.P. Tacitus: Annals 1. London: Bristol Classical Press, 1992.
Polybius. The Histories I. Trans. W. R. Paton. Cambridge, Massachusetts: Harvard University Press, 1967.
Walbank, F. W. Polybius. Berkeley: University of California Press, 1972.

Further reading

 Aili, Hans. 1979. The Prose Rhythm of Sallust and Livy. Stockholm: Almqvist & Wiksell.
 Damon, Cynthia. 2006. "Rhetoric and Historiography." In A Companion to Roman Rhetoric. Edited by W. Dominik and J. Hall, 439-450. Oxford: Blackwell Publishers.
 Davies, Jason. 2004. Rome’s Religious History: Livy, Tacitus, and Ammianus on their Gods. Cambridge, UK: Cambridge Univ. Press
 Eckstein, Arthur M. 1995. Moral Vision in the Histories of Polybius. Berkeley: University of California Press. 
 Humphries, Mark. 2002. "In Mommsen's Shade: Roman Historiography, Past and Present." Classics Ireland 9: 28-45.
 Kraus, Christina Shuttleworth, John Marincola, C. B. R. Pelling, and A. J. Woodman, eds. 2010. Ancient Historiography and its Contexts: Studies in Honour of A. J. Woodman. Oxford: Oxford Univ. Press.
 Kraus, Christina Shuttleworth, and A. J. Woodman. 1997. Latin Historians. Oxford: Oxford Univ. Press.
 McDonald, A. H. 1975. "Theme and Style in Roman Historiography." Journal of Roman Studies 65:1–10.
 Mehl, Andreas. 2011. Roman Historiography: An Introduction to its Basic Aspects and Development. Translated by Hans-Friedrich Mueller. Chichester, UK: Wiley-Blackwell Publishing.
 Miller, John F., and A. J. Woodman, eds. 2010. Latin Historiography and Poetry in the Early Empire Generic Interactions. Leiden, The Netherlands: Brill.
 Roller, Matthew. 2009. "The Exemplary Past in Roman Historiography and Culture." In The Cambridge Companion to the Roman Historians. Edited by Andrew Feldherr, 214–230. Cambridge, UK: Cambridge Univ. Press.
Sacks, Kenneth. 1990. Diodorus Siculus and the First Century. Princeton University Press.
Usher, Stephen. 1970. The Historians of Greece and Rome. New York: Taplinger.
 Vasaly, Ann. 2009. "Characterization and Complexity: Caesar, Sallust, and Livy." In The Cambridge Companion to the Roman Historians. Edited by Andrew Feldherr, 245–260. Cambridge, UK: Cambridge Univ. Press.

 
Ancient Roman studies
Latin-language literature